WGTK (970 kHz) is a commercial AM radio station in Louisville, Kentucky. It is owned by Word Media Group and it airs a conservative talk radio format.  Similar to many Salem Media Group talk stations, it calls itself "970 The Answer."  Its studios and offices are on Corporate Campus Drive in Louisville, while its transmitter is on Hamburg Pike in Jeffersonville, Indiana.

On weekdays, WGTK runs the entire line up of Salem Radio Network syndicated talk shows:  Hugh Hewitt, Mike Gallagher, Dennis Prager, Michael Medved, Larry Elder and Joe Walsh.  WGTK had aired a local midday show with former WHAS host Joe Elliott but that was discontinued in the Fall of 2015.  The station begins most hours with co-owned Townhall Radio News.  WGTK is the radio home of Bellarmine University men's basketball.

In the 1990s, the WGTK call letters belonged to a classic rock station in Middlebury, Vermont (now WWFY in Berlin).  When Salem acquired an FM station in the Greenville-Spartanburg, South Carolina radio market, it used the same call letters, with that station known as WGTK-FM since February 2013.

History

Early years
In 1927, the station began as WFIW in Hopkinsville, Kentucky. In 1932, WFIW was bought by George Norton Jr., and its transmitter was moved to Louisville, with the call letters being changed to WAVE.  WAVE was originally on AM 940 and was an NBC Red Network affiliate.  It carried NBC's schedule of dramas, comedies, news, sports, soap operas, game shows and big band broadcasts during the "Golden Age of Radio."  After the North American Regional Broadcasting Agreement (NARBA) took effect, WAVE moved to AM 970.

In 1948, it added the first TV station in Kentucky, WAVE-TV.  Because WAVE (AM) had been a long-time NBC Radio affiliate, WAVE-TV primarily carried NBC programs.

MOR and oldies
As network programming shifted from radio to TV during the 1950s, WAVE began airing a full-service MOR format, which later shifted to oldies. In 1988, WAVE was sold to Radio One (unrelated to the company now known as Urban One that eventually bought stations in the Louisville market in the late 1990s).  Because the TV station kept the WAVE call sign, the AM station changed call letters to WAVG; this was necessitated by Federal Communications Commission rules at the time, since repealed.

In the fall of 1989, the station dropped local programming and began running a satellite-fed syndicated oldies format. On September 4, 1990, WAVG switched to an adult standards format.

In 1991, WAVG was sold to Sunnyside Communications. On January 8, 1997, Sunnyside announced it would sell WAVG to Pulitzer, then-owners of WLKY-TV, which announced plans to flip the station to an all-news format, with AP News Radio programming and simulcasts of WLKY's TV newscasts. The changeover took place at noon on June 16. At the same time, the WAVG call letters and standards format moved to 1450 AM, while 970 adopted the WLKY call sign.

Purchase by Salem
In August 2000, Hearst-Argyle (which bought all of Pulitzer's broadcasting outlets the year before) sold the radio station to Salem Communications.  Salem flipped it to a talk radio format as WGTK.

On January 5, 2015, WGTK rebranded as "970 The Answer".

On December 22, 2016, it was announced that Word Broadcasting Network, owner of ION Television affiliate WBNA and operator of non-commercial Contemporary Christian station WJIE-FM, would take over operations of WGTK and sister stations WFIA and WFIA-FM under a local marketing agreement, effective January 3, 2017. On February 10, 2020, Word Broadcasting announced that it would take advantage of the option in its agreement to acquire the stations from Salem for $4 million; the sale was completed on May 25, 2022.

On February 17, 2022, it was announced that Louisville First Media Group, a partnership between the operators of both WLCL and WGTK, had struck a broadcast rights deal, wherein the two stations would replace WHAS and WKRD as the official home for University of Louisville Cardinals athletics. The two stations carry all of the university's football, men’s and women’s basketball, and baseball games; seasonal football and basketball coaches shows; and a daily "Cardinal Insider" program (which also airs on Word Media Group-owned WXVW). Previous flagship WHAS had prioritized in-state rivals, the University of Kentucky Wildcats, with conflicting Cardinals games airing on WKRD.

References

External links
WGTK Official Site

FCC History Cards for WGTK (covering WFIW / WAVE from 1927-1981)

GTK
News and talk radio stations in the United States
Conservative talk radio
Radio stations established in 1927
1927 establishments in Kentucky